Baron Lajos Dóczi, aka Dóczy ((born "Dux"), 29/30 November 1845, Sopron (Oedenburg) - 28 August 1918, Budapest) was a Jewish (later Christian) Hungarian poet, journalist. His father, Adolf Dux, was a wine trader, and is not to be confused with the writer of the same name, Adolf Dux.

After finishing his preliminary education he studied law in Vienna, joining at the same time the staff of Die Presse. His political articles, which advocated the "Ausgleich" (agreement) with Austria, were very favorably received, and on the recommendation of Balthasar Horváth, then Minister of Justice, he was appointed (1868) clerk in the office of the prime minister.

When Count Julius Andrássy became minister of foreign affairs (1872) Dóczy accompanied him to Vienna, and was soon appointed "Sectionsrath", and later "Hofrath", at the Foreign Office. In 1899 he was elevated to the rank of baron, and in 1902 retired from public life. He resided in Deutschkreutz and Budapest.

Dóczy's reputation rests not on the services he rendered to the state, but on his achievements as a dramatic writer and as a translator. Csók (The Kiss), his best-known comedy, which is played in German as well as in Hungarian theaters, gained the prize of the Hungarian Academy in 1871; the German translation was made by the author himself.

Among his other plays are:
 Utolsó Szerelem (Last Love), 1879
 Széchy Mária, 1886
 Vegyes: Párok (Mixed Marriages), 1889
 Vera Grófnő, 1891
 Ellinor Királyleány, tragedy, 1897

Besides these he translated Schauffert's comedy Schach dem König, 1873, and wrote the libretto to Karl Goldmark's Merlin and to Johann Strauss II.'s Ritter Pázmán.

His Hungarian translation of Goethe's Faust and his German adaptation of Imre Madách's Az ember tragédiája (German: Die Tragödie des Menschen) were well received. His collected poems and novels appeared in 1890. His last work was a Hungarian translation of Schiller's poems (1902).

Notes

References
 József Szinnyei (hu), Magyar Irók Élete, s.v.
 

1845 births
1918 deaths
Hungarian male poets
Hungarian translators
Hungarian librettists
Hungarian Jews
People from Sopron
Opera librettists
Hungarian male novelists
19th-century translators
19th-century Hungarian poets
19th-century Hungarian novelists
19th-century Hungarian male writers
20th-century Hungarian male writers
20th-century Hungarian poets
20th-century Hungarian novelists